Crane High School is a public high school located in Crane, Texas, United States. It is part of the Crane Independent School District which covers all of Crane County and is classified as a 3A school by the UIL. In 2015, the school was rated "Met Standard" by the Texas Education Agency.

Athletics
The Crane Golden Cranes and Ladybirds compete in the following sports:

Baseball
Basketball, boys and girls
Cross country, boys and girls
Football
Golf, boys and girls
Powerlifting, boys and girls
Softball
Tennis, boys and girls
Track and field, boys and girls
Volleyball

UIL State Titles
Boys Track Team:
2006 (2A) 
Girls Track Team:
2004 (2A)
Volleyball Team:
1970 (1A)^, 1974(1A)^, and 1975(2A)
Boys Tennis:
1962 (2A doubles) - Jerry Box and John Hoestenback
1968 (2A doubles) - Glenn Fletcher and Jackie Box
1971 (2A doubles) - Don Adams and Jay Box
1972 (2A doubles) - Don Adams and Jay Box
1972 (2A singles) - John Johnson
1973 (2A doubles) - Don Adams and John Johnson
Girls Tennis:
 1973 (2A doubles) - Terri Anderegg and Lynette Lewis

^ Was spring sport

Crane Bethune (PVIL)
Boys Basketball Team:
1958(PVIL-B), 1961(PVIL-B), 1962(PVIL-B)

Academics
UIL Academic Meet Champions:
1992 (3A)
UIL Editorial Writing:
1984 (3A) - Wesley Moore
UIL Feature Writing:
1970 (2A) - Jill Rodgers
1987 (3A) - Kristi Rey
UIL News Writing:
1972 (2A) - Cheryl Fox
1982 (3A) - Tim Lowe
1986 (3A) - Kristi Rey
UIL Number Sense:
1977 (2A) - David Bizzak
1993 (3A Team) - Scott Huddleston, Ricky Solis, Peter Leupold
UIL Persuasive Speaking:
1967 (2A) - Thomas Morris
UIL Poetry Interpretation:
1978 (2A) - Dee Dee Smartt
1979 (2A) - Dee Dee Smartt
UIL Current Events:
1992 (3A) - Keith Bullard
UIL Cross-Examination Debate:
1992 (3A) - Dusty Boyd and Thad Norvell

Crane Golden Crane Bands
UIL State Marching Band Championship Contest:
The Crane HS Band has had 18 UIL State Marching Band Contest appearances, and is currently tied for sixth most appearances (Classes A-6A) in the State of Texas overall.

UIL Marching Sweepstakes:
1983, 1984, 1985, 1986, 1987, 1988, 1989, 1990, 1991, 1992, 1993, 1994, 1995, 1996, 1997, 1998, 1999, 2000, 2001, 2002, 2003, 2004, 2005, 2006, 2007, 2008, 2009, 2010, 2011, 2012, 2013, 2014, 2015, 2016, 2017, 2018, 2019, 2020, 2021, 2022  
UIL Concert & Sight-Reading Sweepstakes:
1984, 1985, 1986, 1987, 1988, 1989, 1990, 1991, 1992, 1993, 1994, 1995, 1996, 1997, 1998, 1999, 2000, 2001, 2002, 2003, 2004, 2005, 2006, 2007, 2008, 2009, 2010, 2011, 2012, 2013, 2014, 2015, 2016, 2017, 2018, 2019, 2020, 2021, 2022  
UIL State Wind Ensemble Contest Champions 
1987-1988 – Scott Mason, Director
1988-1989 – Scott Mason, Director
1989-1990 – Jesse Lotspeich, Director
TMEA Honor Band 
Crane HS Band - Scott Mason – Class 3A – 1990 
Crane MS Band - Daniel Todd – Class C – 1998 
ATSSB All-State Musicians:
Crane HS Students have qualified 146 ATSSB All-State Bands Musicians. Crane HS currently has the most ATSSB All-State Bands Musicians since the founding in 1991.

References

External links

Crane Independent School District
Crane High School website

Schools in Crane County, Texas
Public high schools in Texas
Recorded Texas Historic Landmarks